Ilia Sergeevich Semikov (born 22 October 1993) is a Russian cross-country skier who competes internationally with the Russian national team.

He placed 11th overall in the 2021 Tour de Ski, and represented Russia at the FIS Nordic World Ski Championships 2021 in Oberstdorf, Germany, in men's 50 kilometre classical.

Cross-country skiing results
All results are sourced from the International Ski Federation (FIS).

Olympic Games

Distance reduced to 30 km due to weather conditions.

World Championships

World Cup

Season standings

Team podiums
 4 podiums – (4 )

Notes

References

1993 births
Living people
Russian male cross-country skiers
Sportspeople from the Komi Republic
Tour de Ski skiers
Competitors at the 2015 Winter Universiade
Cross-country skiers at the 2022 Winter Olympics
Olympic cross-country skiers of Russia